Aïssa Djermouni or Aïssa El Jermouni or Aissa Merzougui or Aïssa L'Jarmouni (1886–1946) is an Algerian poet and a singer of Berber origin.

Biography 
Aïssa Djermouni was born in M'toussa (Kenchela) in 1886, Merzoug came from the great Berber tribal federation Aïth Kerkath (H'rakta in Arabic) occupying the geographical space between Batna, Khenchela and Aïn Beïda in the South Constantinois; the branch to which he belongs is Igerman, hence his name Jermouni (arabized form). He is of peasant origin. His impresario was a native Jew, Mr. Snoussi, who introduced him to record companies such as Philips, Ouardaphone, etc. from the early thirties.

Sources
 Book, Ounissi. Mohamed. Salah : Aïssa L'Jarmouni, champion de la chanson aurésienne, ANEP, Rouiba, 2000, Algeria.
 Book, La culture africiane: le symposium d'Alger, 21 juillet-1er août 1969, Société nationale d'édition et de diffusion, 1969.

References

Sources
 Encyclopédie berbere in ligne 
 book google inligne

1886 births
1946 deaths
Berber musicians
Chaoui people
19th-century Algerian people
20th-century Algerian people